Alhassane Soumah (born 2 March 1996) is a Guinean professional footballer who plays as an attacking midfielder.

Career
On 25 July 2015, Soumah made his senior debut for Vidi, playing 35 minutes as a substitute in a 1-0 loss to Szombathelyi Haladás.

On 7 July 2018, Soumah joined Austrian club Wattens on a season-long loan deal.

References

External links

1996 births
Sportspeople from Conakry
Living people
Association football midfielders
Juventus F.C. players
Fehérvár FC players
Cercle Brugge K.S.V. players
FC Chiasso players
WSG Tirol players
Expatriate footballers in Italy
Expatriate footballers in Hungary
Expatriate footballers in Switzerland
Expatriate footballers in Austria
Nemzeti Bajnokság I players
Challenger Pro League players
Swiss Challenge League players
2. Liga (Austria) players
Guinean footballers